Saffet Elkatmış (born 1 November 1995) is a Turkish long-distance runner. He competed in the men's race at the 2020 World Athletics Half Marathon Championships held in Gdynia, Poland.

In 2019, he competed in the men's half marathon at the Summer Universiade held in Naples, Italy. He finished in 7th place. He won the silver medal in the team event.

References

External links 
 

Living people
1995 births
Place of birth missing (living people)
Turkish male long-distance runners
Competitors at the 2019 Summer Universiade
Universiade medalists in athletics (track and field)
Universiade silver medalists for Turkey
21st-century Turkish people